Edelsteinaspididae is an extinct family of trilobite in the order Corynexochida. There are about seven genera and at least two described species in Edelsteinaspididae.

Genera
These seven genera belong to the family Edelsteinaspididae:
 Poliaxis
 † Alacephalus Repina, 1960
 † Edelsteinaspis Lermontova, 1940
 † Labradoria Resser, 1936
 † Laticephalus Pokrovskaya, 1959
 † Paleofossus Pokrovskaya, 1959
 † Polliaxis Palmer, 1968

References

 
Articles created by Qbugbot
Trilobite families